Strategic media runs opposed to tactical media in the sense that it is power (or in this case media influence) coming from a "higher" entity to control those with less power. It is essentially the material that larger media companies screen to the masses. The information is processed by the few and spread to the masses, it has the potential to guide or misguide audiences depending on the strategy of the media influence.

See also 
 Subaltern (postcolonialism)
 Al Jazeera effect
 Agenda-setting theory
 Media influence

References 

Influence of mass media